Huang Yaqiong (born 28 February 1994) is a Chinese badminton player who specializes in doubles. She won the prestigious All England Open in 2017 partnered with Lu Kai, and in 2019 with Zheng Siwei. Together with Lu, she emerged as the champion at the 2017 Asian Championships. With her current partner Zheng, she won the gold medal at the 2018 Asian Games, and claimed the BWF World Championships titles in 2018, 2019, and 2022. Huang was made the Female Player of the Year by the BWF in 2018 and 2019.

Career 

Huang and her partner, Zheng Siwei, competed at the 2020 Summer Olympics as the top seeds. They won a silver medal after being defeated by their compatriots Wang Yilyu and Huang Dongping in the final in a close rubber game.

Achievements

Olympic Games 
Mixed doubles

BWF World Championships 
Mixed doubles

Asian Games 
Mixed doubles

Asian Championships 
Mixed doubles

BWF World Junior Championships 
Girls' doubles

Mixed doubles

Asian Junior Championships 
Girls' doubles

BWF World Tour (24 titles, 8 runners-up) 

The BWF World Tour, which was announced on 19 March 2017, and implemented in 2018, is a series of elite badminton tournaments sanctioned by the Badminton World Federation (BWF). The BWF World Tour is divided into levels of World Tour Finals, Super 1000, Super 750, Super 500, Super 300, and the BWF Tour Super 100.

Mixed doubles

BWF Superseries (9 titles, 3 runners-up) 
The BWF Superseries, which was launched on 14 December 2006, and implemented in 2007, was a series of elite badminton tournaments, sanctioned by the Badminton World Federation (BWF). BWF Superseries levels were Superseries and Superseries Premier. A season of Superseries consisted of twelve tournaments around the world that had been introduced since 2011. Successful players were invited to the Superseries Finals, which were held at the end of each year.

Women's doubles

Mixed doubles

  BWF Superseries Finals tournament
  BWF Superseries Premier tournament
  BWF Superseries tournament

BWF Grand Prix (10 titles, 8 runners-up) 
The BWF Grand Prix had two levels, the Grand Prix and Grand Prix Gold. It was a series of badminton tournaments sanctioned by the Badminton World Federation (BWF) and played between 2007 and 2017.

Women's doubles

Mixed doubles

  BWF Grand Prix Gold tournament
  BWF Grand Prix tournament

Performance timeline

National team 
 Junior level

 Senior level

Individual competitions

Junior level
 Girls' doubles

 Mixed doubles

Senior level

Women's doubles

Mixed doubles

References

External links 

 
 

1994 births
Living people
Badminton players from Zhejiang
Chinese female badminton players
Badminton players at the 2020 Summer Olympics
Olympic badminton players of China
Olympic silver medalists for China
Olympic medalists in badminton
Medalists at the 2020 Summer Olympics
Badminton players at the 2018 Asian Games
Asian Games gold medalists for China
Asian Games silver medalists for China
Asian Games medalists in badminton
Medalists at the 2018 Asian Games
World No. 1 badminton players
BWF Best Female Player of the Year
21st-century Chinese women